Kansas City Life Insurance Company is a public insurance company established in 1895 and located in Kansas City, Missouri.  The company's 1,400 agents market individual life, annuity and group products through agencies located in 48 US states and the District of Columbia. Variable life, variable annuities, mutual funds and other investment options are offered through a subsidiary, Sunset Financial Services.

The Kansas City Life Group of Companies:

Kansas City Life Insurance Company
Old American Insurance Company
Sunset Life Insurance Company of America
Sunset Financial Services Inc.

About 

Kansas City Life Insurance Company was established in 1895 in Kansas City, Mo.  It currently offers term, whole life, and universal life products, including indexed universal life and variable universal life.

History 

Originally chartered as Bankers Life Association on May 1, 1895, the Company was founded by Major William Warner, President; J.H. North, Vice President; and S.E. Rumble, Secretary. Rumble conceived the idea of forming a life insurance company in the "heart of America." At the time, Kansas City was known as the Athens of the West and was the second largest city in the western half of the United States; only San Francisco was larger.

The Kansas City Life Insurance Company name was adopted in 1900. The company began issuing policies in small amounts from an office in the Scheidley Building, located at Ninth and Main Streets in Kansas City, Mo.

In 1897, the company moved to the Navajo Building, then the Rialto Building, where it remained until 1924 when the Company moved to its present location. The Home Office sits on approximately five acres of land purchased for $200,000. Built for $1 million, the building was dedicated on Aug. 1, 1924. The building was one of the first designed by Wight and Wight architects, who later designed Kansas City City Hall, Jackson County Courthouse in Kansas City, Nelson-Atkins Museum of Art, and more. The company also owns residential real estate by the Home Office. These purchases began in the late 1960s as part of the Penn Valley Redevelopment Project.

In 2015, a majority of Kansas City Life shareholders voted to de-list from the NASDAQ stock exchange in an effort to reduce costs and shift more shares to company ownership. The stock is still sold over the counter.

Litigation 
In June 2019, after obtaining a judgment of $34 million for suing State Farm for overcharges in 2018, Stueve Siegel Hanson LLP and Miller Schirger, LLC filed lawsuit against Kansas City Life Insurance Co, alleging the company “systematically overcharged” clients.

In June 2019 Two firms filed a class-action lawsuit against Kansas City Life Insurance alleging the company “systematically overcharged” customers without permission. “The policies may become unaffordable, leaving policy owners without life insurance when it is needed most,” the firms said in a joint news release.

In November, 2019 a Kansas City Life Co. client filed a class-action lawsuit accusing the life insurance provider of charging fees in excess of the limits outlined in its contract on 01 of October 2018. Plaintiff J. Gregory Sheldon bought a Flexible Premium Variable Life Insurance Contract Nonparticipating policy from Kansas City Life in December 2000. In addition to a death benefit, the policy provides an interest-bearing component that accumulates value over time.

In May 2020 A Missouri federal court recently found that Kansas City Life Insurance Company (“KC Life”) wrongfully rejected a certified nurse anesthetist’s claims for both short-term disability (STD) and long-term disability (LTD) benefits. KC Life rejected the claim because the insured was fired from his job because he was, "so addicted to Fentanyl that he injects himself at work."

Recent Financial Updates

April 25, 2022—The Board of Directors of Kansas City Life Insurance Company declared a quarterly dividend of $0.14 per share on April 25, 2022. The dividend will be payable on May 11, 2022, to stockholders of record on May 5, 2022. This amount of the dividend represents a significant reduction in the quarterly dividend that has been paid by the Company since 2001. The Board elected to reduce the dividend due to operating losses and increased capital reserve requirements in the last few years due to a significant higher than expected mortality rate since COVID 19 pandemic coupled with the longer-term impact from lower than expected interest income.

References

External links
Company website

Companies based in Kansas City, Missouri
Life insurance companies of the United States
American companies established in 1895
Financial services companies established in 1895
Companies formerly listed on the Nasdaq
1895 establishments in Missouri